Laux is a surname. Notable people with the surname include:

Constance Laux (born 1952), American writer of romance novels
Dorianne Laux (born 1952), American poet
France Laux (1897–1978), American sportscaster, the first full-time radio voice of baseball in St. Louis
Philipp Laux (born 1973), German former footballer, now Sports psychologist

See also
Chauvac-Laux-Montaux, commune in the Drôme department in southeastern France